The third season of the American reality competition streaming series The Circle began on Netflix on September 8, 2021, and concluded on September 29, 2021. The season was announced in March 2020 when Netflix renewed The Circle for a second and third season. Michelle Buteau returned as host.

Like the previous seasons, players compete against each other to become the most popular, but do not actually meet their competitors. Instead, they communicate through a specially designed app and are able to portray themselves in any way they choose. In August 2021 ahead of the season premiere, the series was renewed for a fourth and fifth season.

On September 29, 2021, the season was won by James Andre Jefferson Jr., who had played the game as himself, and won the US$100,000 prize that came along with it. Matthew Pappadia as "Ashley" was the runner-up. Keisha "Kai" Ghost won the Fan Favorite award and US$10,000.

Format 

The contestants, or "players", move into the same apartment building. However, the contestants do not meet face-to-face during the course of the competition, as they each live in their own individual apartment. They communicate solely using their profiles on a specially-designed social media app that gives them the ability to portray themselves in any way they choose. Players can thus opt to present themselves as a completely different personality to the other players, a tactic otherwise known as catfishing.

Throughout the series, the contestants "rate" one another from first to last place. At the end of the ratings, their average ratings are revealed to one another from lowest to highest. Normally, the two highest-rated players become "Influencers", while the remaining players will be at risk of being "blocked" by the Influencers. However, occasionally there may be a twist to the blocking process – varying from the lowest rating players being instantly blocked, the identity of the Influencers being a secret, or multiple players being blocked at one time. Blocked players are eliminated from the game, but are given the opportunity to meet one player still in the game in-person. A video message is shown to the remaining players to reveal if they were real or fake the day after.

During the finale, the contestants rate each other one final time, where the highest rated player wins the game and US$100,000. Also, fans of The Circle are able to vote for their favorite player. The player that receives the most votes is known as the Fan Favorite and receives US$10,000.

Players

Episodes

Results and elimination

Notes 
 : After the ratings were revealed, the players were alerted that Kai would be the sole influencer and must block someone by herself. She ended up choosing Ava.
 : After Ava was blocked, Ava and Chanel were given a second chance to play but had to clone another player, and ended up choosing to clone Michelle.
 : Both Michelle's were at risk of being blocked. The other players were tasked with voting one to be blocked, and the Michelle with the most votes was blocked from The Circle.
 : After being blocked in Episode 7, Calvin had to choose one player to give a secret advantage to. Calvin chose Nick, giving him the power of a second profile known as "Vince", although he still kept his original profile.
 : In Episode 9, "Vince" was revealed to be the second profile of an existing player and removed from the game.
 : The players' ratings were not revealed, instead the top two players would become secret influencers. James & Nick both placed the highest.
 : The players made their final ratings.

References 

Circle
The Circle (franchise)